Isaac Bentsionovich Kleiman (11 January 1921 – February 13, 2012), is a Ukrainian Soviet archaeologist specialist in the history of antiquity.

Biography 
He studied at the Leningrad Artillery School (1939–1941). Member of the Great Patriotic War. After demobilization he graduated from the Faculty of History, University of Odessa (1952).

Field of interest - Antique Archaeology, especially in the western part of the Northern Black Sea coast, the ancient city of Tyras at the mouth of the Dniester. Published about 100 scientific papers.

From 1963 to 1988 - head and deputy head of the archaeological expedition to excavate ancient and medieval Tira Belgorod. Also participated in other archaeological expeditions in the North-West Black Sea region.

He worked at the Odessa Archeological Museum, National Academy of Sciences of Ukraine, for several years headed the department of Classical Archaeology Museum.

Books 
The City of Tyras. A Historical and Archaeological Essay. Одесса: Polis-Press, 1994

External links

2012 deaths
Ukrainian archaeologists
1921 births
Odessa Archaeological School
Odesa University alumni
Soviet archaeologists
20th-century Ukrainian historians